Appledore may refer to:

Places

England
 Appledore, Kent
 Appledore (Kent) railway station
 Appledore, Mid Devon, near Tiverton
 Appledore, Torridge, North Devon, near Bideford

U.S.A.
 Appledore Island, off the coast of Maine

In fiction
 Appledore, a fictional house in "His Last Vow", an episode of the BBC TV series Sherlock

Ships and shipbuilding
 Appledore II (schooner), schooner based in Camden, Maine
 Appledore Shipbuilders, a company in Devon, England
 HMS Appledore (1919), minesweeper

Other
 Appledore F.C., a football club based in Appledore, Torridge

See also
Apeldoorn, a city in the Netherlands